Priscilla Steenbergen (born 25 July 1998) is a Dutch female professional darts player who currently plays in the World Darts Federation (WDF) and Professional Darts Corporation (PDC) events. Her biggest achievement to date was playing in the quarter-finals at the 2022 WDF World Darts Championship. She was a silver and bronze medalist of the WDF Europe Cup.

Career
After not being able to qualify for the BDO World Darts Championship from the qualifiers in 2016, she went to the third round at the 2016 Winmau World Masters, where she lost to Trina Gulliver by 1–4 in legs. In 2017, she was in the quarter-finals of the Hal Masters. In 2019, she advanced to the quarter-finals at the German Open and made it to the 2019 BDO World Trophy via the play-off qualifiers. During this tournament, she lost in the first round match to Aileen de Graaf by 0–4 in legs. In 2020, Steenbergen made it to the quarterfinals at the 2020 Dutch Open and again lost match to Aileen de Graaf.

In 2022, she took part in the 2022 WDF World Darts Championship for the first time. She was replaced Fallon Sherrock after her withdrew, as the highest ranked World Darts Federation player which not already qualified. In the first round match she beat Darlene van Sleeuwen by 2–1 in sets. In the second round he beat Anca Zijlstra with the same result. In the quarter-finals, she was defeated by Kirsty Hutchinson by 1–2 in sets. After a very good result at the WDF World Darts Championship, she took part in the 2022 PDC Women's Series for the first time. During the series held in Hildesheim, Steenbergen reached the quarter-finals three times. At the Belfry Open, she advanced to the semi-finals of the senior tournament for the first time and finally lost to Aileen de Graaf by 2–4 in legs. At the 2022 Dutch Open she was eliminated in the second round.

At the end of September 2022, she was selected by the national federation to participate in the 2022 WDF Europe Cup. On the second day of the tournament, she advanced to the second round of the singles competition, where she lost to Aurora Fochesato by 2–4 in legs. On the third day, she advanced to the quarter-finals of the pairs competition, where she played together with Noa-Lynn van Leuven. They lost to Anna Forsmark and Maud Jansson from Sweden by 0–4 in legs. In the team tournament, she won a silver medal. They lost in the final match to England by 1–9 in legs. They also took the bronze medal in the overall classification.

On 26th November 2022, Priscilla picked up her 1st WDF title winning the Italian Grand Masters beating Paula Jacklin in the final 6-5.

World Championship results

WDF
 2022: Quarter-finals (lost to Kirsty Hutchinson 1–2) (sets)
 2023:

Performance timeline

References

Living people
1998 births
British Darts Organisation players
Female darts players
Dutch darts players